A constitutional referendum was held in the Central African Republic on 21 November 1986, following a military coup in 1981. The new constitution would make the country a one-party state with the Central African Democratic Rally as the sole legal party. The presidential term was to be set at six years, with no term limits. Under its provisions, André Kolingba, who had led the military regime since 1981, was automatically elected as president. It was approved by 92.22% of voters with an 87.6% turnout.

Following the referendum, parliamentary elections took place in July 1987.

Results

References

1986 referendums
1986 in the Central African Republic
1986
Constitutional referendums